Hoseynabad (also Romanized as Ḩoseynābād) is a village in Harabarjan Rural District, Marvast District, Khatam County, Yazd Province, Iran. At the 2006 census, its population was 37, in 21 families.

References 

Populated places in Khatam County